Club Deportivo Huarte is a Spanish football team based in Huarte/Uharte in the autonomous community of Navarre. Founded in 1975, it plays in 3ª - Group 15. Its stadium is Estadio Areta with a capacity of 1,500 seaters.

Season to season

18 seasons in Tercera División

References

External links
Futbolme team profile 
Futnavarra.es profile 

Football clubs in Navarre
Association football clubs established in 1975
1975 establishments in Spain